Thiers is a French place name and surname. It may refer to:

Places in France
 Thiers, Puy-de-Dôme, a commune in the eponymous canton 
 Canton of Thiers, Puy-de-Dôme, in the eponymous arrondissement 
 Arrondissement of Thiers, Puy-de-Dôme
 Thiers-sur-Thève, a commune in the Oise department
 Thiers, Marseille, neighbourhood of the 1st arrondissement of Marseille

People
 Adolphe Thiers (1797–1877), French statesman and historian
 , co-founder of Verdinaso
 Harry D. Thiers (1919–2000), American mycologist
 Jean du Thiers (died 1559), French Minister of Finance under Henri II
 Louisa Thiers (1814–1926), American supercentenarian
 Manfred Thiers, bassist for Moti Special
 Saint Stephen of Thiers, medieval Saint of the Roman Catholic Church

Variants 
 Samuel O. Thier (born 1937), American medical professor
 Steffen Thier (born 1980), German rugby union player
 Henry de Thier or Henri Dumont (1610–1684), baroque composer
 Kai Tier, Australian comedian and actor
 Nancy Hopkins Tier (1909–1997), American aviator
 Nigel Tier (born 1958), English badminton player
 Floris De Tier (born 1992), Belgian racing cyclist

Other uses 
 Thiers wall, a defensive wall in Paris
 Thiers Coal Mine, Bruay-sur-l'Escaut, Nord, France
 President Thiers Bank, a bank and seamount near Rapa Iti in French Polynesia
 SA Thiers, a French soccer team
 Thiers' law (good money drives out bad)

See also

 

French-language surnames